Jackson Williams Tarver Sr. (March 2, 1917 – March 22, 1999) was a publisher in Atlanta. He published the Atlanta Journal-Constitution in the 1960s and was Chairman of the Associated Press from 1977 to 1983. Mercer University awards a scholarship in his honor. He was also an executive at Cox Enterprises.

He was born in Savannah, Georgia.

References

1917 births
1999 deaths
People from Savannah, Georgia
20th-century American newspaper publishers (people)
The Atlanta Journal-Constitution people
Associated Press people
American newspaper executives
20th-century American businesspeople